Ary Rongel (H44) is an ice-strengthened oceanographic research ship of the Brazilian Navy.  It was built by the Georg Eide's Sønner of Høylandsbygd, Norway as Polar Queen and was launched on 22 January 1981. It was acquired by the Brazilian Navy in 1994 for the Brazilian Antarctic Program.

Description
As built, the ship was an ice-strengthened research vessel.

The ship is equipped with a helipad and is capable of operating up to two UH-13 Helibrás Esquilo helicopters.

Service history
The research vessel was constructed at Georg Eide's Sønner in Hoylandsbygd, Norway with the yard number 111. The vessel's keel was laid down on 27 September 1980 and the ship was launched on 22 January 1981 as Polar Queen. Polar Queen was completed in March 1981.

The vessel was put up for sale and was acquired by the Brazilian Navy on 19 April 1994 for use as a polar research ship assigned to the Brazilian Antarctic Program. Renamed Ary Rongel for Admiral Ary dos Santos Rongel, the ship was commissioned into the Brazilian Navy on 25 April 1994 and given the hull number H44. The ship is homeported in Rio de Janeiro.

References

Bibliography

External links
 

Naval ships of Brazil
Auxiliary ships of the Brazilian Navy
1981 ships